Abduction! by Peg Kehret, is a novel about a 13-year-old girl named Bonnie who searches for her brother Matt and their dog Pookie who were both abducted. Her abductor, a mystery at first, ends up being someone much close to home.

Plot summary
Matt, a six-year old boy, is kidnapped by his father, Denny, whom he had never met. Though he has always dreamed of meeting him, nothing is the way he thought it would be, given his father is only using Matt to impress his sister who often brags about her two well-raised sons.  Denny has also taken Matt's dog, Pookie, and then dropped him off in a park. With few clues to follow, Matt's mother, sister, and the police, are doing everything they can to find him. Some old folks found Pookie and later gave him back to Matt's mom and sister. Matt's sister, Bonnie, sees Matt at a Mariner's baseball game, but is caught by Denny. Now both captive, the siblings attempt to escape. On the ferry, Bonnie signals to Matt to throw his hardest pitch. The baseball hits Denny, which allows the two to escape. Denny is arrested, and the children return home safely.

Awards
In 2007, Abduction! was awarded the Mark Twain Award by the Missouri Association of School Librarians.

References

2004 children's books
2004 American novels
American children's novels
Dutton Children's Books books
Novels about child abduction
Mark Twain Awards